Penallt Viaduct is a viaduct that formerly carried the Wye Valley Railway over the River Wye, which at this location forms the border between England (Gloucestershire) and Wales (Monmouthshire). The  Wye Valley Railway opened on 1 November 1876.

Passenger services ceased on the railway in 1959 and it closed to freight in January 1964. The viaduct is still open to carry a public footpath, attached to the upstream girders of the viaduct, over the Wye between the villages of Redbrook and Penallt.

The footbridge was jointly provided by the pre-1974 Monmouthshire and Gloucestershire County Councils who agreed in 1953 to pay for the construction of the footbridge attached to the viaduct.

See also
List of crossings of the River Wye
List of railway bridges and viaducts in the United Kingdom

References

Urban75 - Wye Valley Railway

Railway viaducts in Gloucestershire
Wye Valley Railway
Railway bridges in Monmouthshire
Forest of Dean
Pedestrian bridges in England
Pedestrian bridges in Wales
Railway viaducts in Wales
Bridges across the River Wye
Former railway bridges in the United Kingdom